Paolo Stoppa Knight Grand Cross (6 June 1906 – 1 May 1988) was an Italian actor.

Biography

Born in Rome, he began as a stage actor in 1927 in the theater in Rome and began acting in films in 1932. As a stage actor, his most celebrated works include those after World War II, when he met director Luchino Visconti: the two, together with Stoppa's wife, actress Rina Morelli, formed a trio whose adaptations of works by authors such as Chekhov, Shakespeare and Goldoni became highly acclaimed. He gave to the theater a personal touch with his energetic play.

He debuted in television in 1960 in the drama series Vita col padre e con la madre, reaching the top of the popularity in the 1970s, in particular in the adaptation of crime novels by Friedrich Dürrenmatt (Il giudice e il suo boia and Il sospetto) and Augusto De Angelis.

As a film actor, Stoppa made some 194 appearances between 1932 and his retirement in 1983, with roles in popular classics such as Miracolo a Milano (1951), Rocco e i suoi fratelli (1960), Viva l'Italia! (1961), Il Gattopardo (1962), La matriarca (1968), and Amici miei atto II (1982). He also had a role in the Sergio Leone epic Once Upon a Time in the West (1968) and a cameo in Becket (1964).

Stoppa was also a renowned dubber of films into Italian. He began this activity in the 1930s as dubber of Fred Astaire. Other actors he dubbed include Richard Widmark, Kirk Douglas and Paul Muni.

Stoppa was initiated into the Scottish Rite Freemasonry.

Filmography

 L'armata azzurra (1932)
 Quella vecchia canaglia (1934) - Giacomo
 Aurora sul mare (1934)
 Il serpente a sonagli (1935) - Andry - L'aiutante dell'ispettore
 The Joker King (1936) - Filuccio
 L'aria del continente (1936) 
 The Anonymous Roylott (1936)
 Marcella (1937)
 La dama bianca (1938) - Il direttore dell'hotel a Cervinia
 The Dream of Butterfly (1939)
 L'amore si fa così (1939) - Zaccaria Poussier
 Frenzy (1939) - Bobby
 Unjustified Absence (1939) - Eugenio Sinibaldi
 L'aria del continente (1939)
 Un'avventura di Salvator Rosa (1939) - Il secondo contadino
 Un mare di guai (1939) - Teodoro
 Wealth Without a Future (1939) - Buby D'Alfia
 Le sorprese del vagone letto (1940) - Il marchese Gino
 Two on a Vacation (1940) - Alvaro Monteiro, il capo reparto della ditta Do-re-mi
  (1940) - Il finto poliziotto
 Love Me, Alfredo! (1940) - Cecè
 La canzone rubata (1940) - Alfredo, il maggiordomo
 Una famiglia impossibile (1940)
 Eternal Melodies (1940) - Haibl, clarinettista
 Il sogno di tutti (1940) - Il signore genovese
 Orizzonte dipinto (1941) - Lighetti
 Giuliano de' Medici (1941) - Volpino
 The Happy Ghost (1941) - Gigetto
 La corona di ferro (1941) - Trifilli
 Divieto di sosta (1941)
 Cenerentola e il signor Bonaventura (1941) - Il signor Bonaventura [Mr. Goodluck - US]
 The Last Dance (1941) - Felix
 Se non son matti non li vogliamo (1941) - Il conte Giuseppe Bardonazzi
 The Brambilla Family Go on Holiday (1941) - Gastone
 Non mi sposo più (1942)
 Se io fossi onesto (1942) - Il conte Paolo Vareghi
 The Queen of Navarre (1942) - Il corriere Babieca
 A che servono questi quattrini? (1942) - Marchitiello
 La signorina (1942) - L' amate di Fani
 Gioco pericoloso (1942) - Giovanni
 The Taming of the Shrew (1942) - Righetto
 Don Giovanni (1942) - Sganarello
 Rossini (1942) - Andrea Tòttola, il librettista
 Don Cesare di Bazan (1942) - Sancho
 Non ti pago! (1942) - L'avvocato Lorenzo Strumillo
  (1942) - Bellavan d'Ormea
 Sette anni di felicità (1942) - Il bandito balbuziente
 Torrents of Spring (1942) - Il dottore Berni
 Happy Days (1942) - Bernardo
 Music on the Run (1943) - Fogliatti, il produttore
 Il nostro prossimo (1943) - Il campanaro
 Incontri di notte (1943) - Francesco
 Gente dell'aria (1943) - Il tenente Guido Landi
 Il treno crociato (1943) - Il ferito con i cani (uncredited)
 Sant'Elena, piccola isola (1943) - Il medico curante di Napoleone
 Grattacieli (1943) - Frank Millstone
 Quattro ragazze sognano (1943) - Al Strong, il gangster
 I nostri sogni (1943) - Oreste
 Gli assi della risata (1943) - Cirillo Mele (segment "L'ombrello smarrito")
 The Last Wagon (1943)
 Apparizione (1943) - Alberto
 Ti conosco, mascherina! (1943) - Luigi
 Grazia (1943)
 Il fiore sotto gli occhi (1944) - Arrigo Santucci
 Finalmente sì (1944) - Rossi
 Quartetto pazzo (1945) - Filippo Osman
 Che distinta famiglia! (1945) - James
 Un americano in vacanza (1946) - Sor Augusto
 I Met You in Naples (1946)
 Canto, ma sottovoce... (1946) - Arturo
 Il marito povero (1946) - Arturo
 Black Eagle (1946) - Un bandito
 Biraghin (1946)
 Farewell, My Beautiful Naples (1947) - Ruocco
 The Opium Den (1947) - amico di Za-la-Mort
 Il principe ribelle (1947)
 I cavalieri dalle maschere nere (1948) - Un nobile balbuziente
 Che tempi! (1948) - Alessandro Raffo
 Fabiola (1949) - Proconsul Manlius Valerian
 Maracatumba... ma non è una rumba (1949) - Miguel Martinez, l'impresario
 I peggiori anni della nostra vita (1949) - Ninetto TRaballa
 Son of d'Artagnan (1950) - Paolo
 Beauty and the Devil (La beauté du diable) (1950) - Official
 Ring Around the Clock (1950) - Rocchetti
 Women and Brigands (1950) - Peppino Luciani
 The Thief of Venice (1950) - Marco
 Sambo (1950) - Manuel Lubreno
 Abbiamo vinto! (1951) - Augusto Fabriano
 Miracolo a Milano (1951) - Rappi
 Without a Flag (1951) - Poggi - Il professore
 The Cape of Hope (1951) - Simon Liakim
 Roma ore 11 (1952) - Impiegato
 The Seven Deadly Sins (Les sept péchés capitaux) (1952) - M. Alvaro (segment "Avarice et la colère, L' / Avarice and Anger")
 Moglie per una notte (1952) - Agusto
 Processo alla città (1952) - Delegato di Polizia Perrone
 Le Petit Monde de Don Camillo (1952)
 Wanda la peccatrice (1952) - Marco
 Beauties of the Night (Les belles de nuit) (1952) - Le directeur de l'Opéra
 Papà diventa mamma (1952)
 Altri tempi (1952) - Guido's father (segment "Idillio")
 Article 519, Penal Code (1952) - Avv. Sardi
 Sunday Heroes (1952) - Piero - aunt Carolina's nephew
 Il tallone d'Achille (1952) - Lo Strozzino Serafino
 Cats and Dogs (1952) - Don Cosimo
 Storms (1953) - Amedeo Cini
 Gioventù alla sbarra (1953) - Il giudice Benni
 Terminal Station (Stazione Termini) (1953) - Annoying man with oranges (uncredited)
 Puccini (1953) - Giocondo
 La voce del silenzio (1953)
 Non è mai troppo tardi (1953) - Antonio Trabbi
 The Return of Don Camillo (Il ritorno di Don Camillo) (1953) - Marchetti
 Buon viaggio pover'uomo (1953)
 Il sole negli occhi (1953) - Egisto Palmucci
 Ci troviamo in galleria (1953) - Voce (uncredited)
 Nemico pubblico n. 1 (L'ennemi public no 1) (1953) - Tony Fallone
 The Love of a Woman (L'amour d'une femme) (1953) - Le curé
 La passeggiata (1953) - Il rettore
 Scampolo 53 (1953)
 The Count of Monte Cristo (Le Comte de Monte-Cristo) (1954) - Bertuccio (2)
 Daughters of Destiny (Destinées) (1954) - Nicephore (segment "Lysistrata")
 Mizar (1954) - Console italiano
 Carosello napoletano (1954) - Salvatore Esposito
 The Cheerful Squadron (1954) - Il maresciallo Flick
 Prima di sera (1954) - Paolo Bancani
 The Beautiful Otero (1954) - Frédéric
 Uomini ombra (1954) - Antiquario Bertrand
 House of Ricordi (1954) - Giovanni Ricordi
 L'oro di Napoli (1954) - Don Peppino - il vedovo (segment "Pizze a credito")
 The Shadow (1954) - Michele
 I sette peccati di papà (J'avais sept filles) (1954) - Antonio
 La corrida dei mariti (Le printemps, l'automne et l'amour) (1955) - (uncredited)
 Siamo uomini o caporali? (1955) - Capt. Black
 Il padrone sono me... (1955) - Mingòn
 La bella di Roma (1955) - Oreste
 La bella mugnaia (1955) - Gardunia
 Destinazione Piovarolo (1955) - Gorini
 Il conte Aquila (1955) - Principe di Metternich
 A Woman Alone (1956)
 Symphony of Love (1956) - Calafatti
 Pepote (Mi tío Jacinto) (1956) - Restaurador
 Ragazze d'oggi (1957) - Peppino Bardellotti
 Arrivederci Dimas (Los Jueves, milagro) (1957) - Don Salvador
 Una pelliccia di visone (1957) - Russo
 Vacanze a Ischia (1957) - Advocate Appicciato
 La nonna Sabella (1957) - Avvocato Emilio Mancuso
 Avventura a Capri (1958)
 È arrivata la parigina (1958)
 La Legge (1959) - Tonio
 Cartagine in fiamme (1960) - Astarito
 Era notte a Roma (1960) - Prince Alessandro Antoniani
 Le tre eccetera del colonnello (1960) - Le marquis
 Rocco e i suoi fratelli (1960) - Cerri
 La contessa azzurra (1960) - Don Peppino Razzi
 La giornata balorda (1960) - Raggionere Moglie
 Gastone (1960) - Achille
 Viva l'Italia! (1961) - Nino Bixio
  (1961) - Cousin
 Che gioia vivere (1961) - Giuseppe Gorgolano, the Hairdresser
 Vanina Vanini (1961) - Asdrubale Vanini
 Il giudizio universale (1961) - Giorgio
  (1962) - Graziani
 Boccaccio '70 (1962) - Lawyer Alcamo (segment "Il lavoro") (uncredited)
 La steppa (1962)
 The Shortest Day (1962) - Padre di Dino
 Il Gattopardo (1963) - Don Calogero Sedara
 Becket (1964) - the Pope / Pope Alexander III
 The Visit (1964) - Doctor
 Behold a Pale Horse (1964) - Pedro
 Male Companion (Un monsieur de compagnie) (1964)
 After the Fox (1966) - Polio
 Il marito è mio e l'ammazzo quando mi pare (1966) - Sperenzoni
 Once Upon a Time in the West (1968) - Sam
 The Libertine (1968) - Professor Zauri
 The Adventures of Gerard (1970) - Santarem, Count of Morales
 Hector the Mighty (1972)
 Jus primae noctis (1972) - The pope
 Rugantino (1973) - Mastro Titta
 Les Bidasses s'en vont en guerre (1974) - Le colonel
 Nerone (1977) - San Pietro
 Beach House (1977) - Il nonno
 La mazzetta (1978) - don Michele Miletti
 Il Marchese del Grillo (1981) - Papa Pio VII
 Tomorrow We Dance (1982) - Father of Mariangela
 All My Friends Part 2 (1982) - Savino Capogreco
 Heads I Win, Tails You Lose (1982) - The Grandpa

References

External links
 

1906 births
1988 deaths
Male actors from Rome
Italian male voice actors
Italian male film actors
Nastro d'Argento winners
Ciak d'oro winners
20th-century Italian male actors
Male Spaghetti Western actors